Hasan Aqeh (also Romanized as Ḩasan Āqeh and Ḩasanāqeh; also known as Ḩasan Neh) is a village in Golmakan Rural District, Golbajar District, Chenaran County, Razavi Khorasan Province, Iran. At the 2006 census, its population was 39, in 22 families.

References 

Populated places in Chenaran County